The 2012 Challenge Chateau Cartier de Gatineau was held from October 25 to 28 at the Centre Sportif Robert-Rochon in Gatineau and at the Buckingham Curling Club in Buckingham, Quebec as part of the 2012–13 World Curling Tour. The men's event was held in a triple knockout format, while the women's event was held in a round-robin format. The purse for the men's event was CAD$40,000, of which the winner, Mark Dacey, received CAD$10,000. The purse for the women's event was CAD$11,500, of which the winner, Julie Reddick, received CAD$3,500.

In the men's final, Mark Dacey defeated Brad Gushue with a score of 7–6, while in the women's final, Julie Reddick defeated Cathy Auld with a score of 8–4.

Men

Teams
The teams are listed as follows:

Knockout results
The draw is listed as follows:

A event

B event

C event

Playoffs
The playoffs draw is listed as follows:

Women

Teams
The teams are listed as follows:

Round-robin standings
Final round-robin standings

Playoffs
The playoffs draw is listed as follows:

References

External links

2012 in Canadian curling
Sport in Gatineau
Curling in Quebec